

Portugal's longest tunnels - in use

Tunnels proposed 
 Serra da Estrela - an 8,600 m tunnel project

References

See also 

 Tunnel
 List of tunnels
 List of long tunnels by type contains separate tables for rock, railroad, subway and vehicular tunnels.
 List of tunnels by location

Portugal
Tunnels
Tunnels